Las Tunas is one of the provinces of Cuba. Major towns include Puerto Padre, Amancio, and the capital city, Las Tunas (historically Victoria de Las Tunas).

Climate and agriculture
The southern coast, which opens onto the Gulf of Guacanayabo, is marshy and characterised by mangroves. This wet area is used to grow sugarcane, as the wet climate is well suited for the crop.

Cattle are also grazed in the province.

History 
Las Tunas was part of the Oriente province, until that province was divided into five smaller provinces in 1975. 

In the same year, a large development program was started to modernize the town of Las Tunas and connect it by road to Havana.

Municipalities

Demographics
In 2004, the province of Las Tunas had a population of 529,850.

See also

Oriente Province

References

External links

Periodico 26 (Las Tunas Province newspaper)
 Las Tunas portal

 
Provinces of Cuba
States and territories established in 1976